Marko Tanasić (born December 2, 1964) is a retired Serbian football midfielder.

He got 38 Eliteserien games in Norway with Strømsgodset, and was also on their losing team in the 1997 Norwegian Football Cup Final.

References

1964 births
Living people
Serbian footballers
FK Spartak Subotica players
Knattspyrnudeild Keflavík players
Strømsgodset Toppfotball players
Sandefjord Fotball players
Association football midfielders
Serbian expatriate footballers
Expatriate footballers in Iceland
Serbian expatriate sportspeople in Iceland
Expatriate footballers in Norway
Serbian expatriate sportspeople in Norway
Eliteserien players
Norwegian First Division players